Hans-Peter Lehnhoff (born 12 July 1963) is a German former professional footballer who played as a midfielder. Since 2000, he worked as a physiotherapist/teammanager with Bayer 04 Leverkusen.

Honours
1. FC Köln
 UEFA Cup: runner-up 1985–86

Royal Antwerp
Belgian Cup: 1991–92
UEFA Cup Winners' Cup: runner-up 1992–93

Bayer Leverkusen
 Bundesliga: runner-up 1996–97, 1998–99

Individual
 Man of the Season (Belgian First Division): 1992–93

References

External links
 

1963 births
Living people
German footballers
Association football midfielders
Bundesliga players
Belgian Pro League players
1. FC Köln players
1. FC Köln II players
Royal Antwerp F.C. players
Bayer 04 Leverkusen players
German expatriate footballers
German expatriate sportspeople in Belgium
Expatriate footballers in Belgium